Sadiqa de Meijer (born 1977)  is a Canadian poet. Her debut collection, Leaving Howe Island, was a nominee for the Governor General's Award for English-language poetry at the 2014 Governor General's Awards and for the 2014 Pat Lowther Award, and her poem "Great Aunt Unmarried" won the CBC's Canada Writes award for poetry in 2012.

She has also published short stories and essays in anthologies and literary magazines, and won the Governor General's Award for English-language non-fiction at the 2021 Governor General's Awards for her book alfabet/alphabet: a memoir of a first language.

Born in Amsterdam, Netherlands and raised in Canada, she currently resides in Kingston, Ontario.

References

1977 births
Living people
Canadian women poets
21st-century Canadian poets
Canadian women short story writers
Meijer, Sadiqa
Writers from Kingston, Ontario
Meijer, Sadiqa
21st-century Canadian women writers
21st-century Canadian short story writers
21st-century Canadian essayists
Canadian women essayists
Governor General's Award-winning non-fiction writers